Wild Brian Kent is a 1936 American drama film directed by Howard Bretherton and starring Ralph Bellamy, Mae Clarke and Helen Lowell.

Cast
 Ralph Bellamy as Brian Kent  
 Mae Clarke as Betty Prentice  
 Helen Lowell as Aunt Sue Prentice  
 Stanley Andrews as Tony Baxter  
 Richard Alexander as Phil Hansen  
 Lew Kelly as Bill  
 Eddy Chandler as Jed  
 Jack Duffy as Old-time fireman  
 Howard C. Hickman as Bob Cruikshank
 Horace B. Carpenter as Warning Rider 
 Lester Dorr as Croupier  
 Herman Hack as Jed's Henchman 
 Henry Hall as Sheriff / Race Announcer 
 Elaine Koehler as Little Girl 
 Merrill McCormick as Bearded Man in Grandstand  
 Gertrude Messinger as Operator  
 Russell Simpson as Race Judge  
 Arthur Thalasso as Man sent to buy drinks  
 Wally West as Gambling Patron

See also
The Re-Creation of Brian Kent (1925)

References

Bibliography
 Goble, Alan. The Complete Index to Literary Sources in Film. Walter de Gruyter, 1999.

External links
 

1936 films
1936 drama films
American drama films
Films directed by Howard Bretherton
20th Century Fox films
American black-and-white films
Films based on American novels
Remakes of American films
Sound film remakes of silent films
1930s English-language films
1930s American films